The St. Charles Battle Site is the area near St. Charles, Arkansas where the Battle of Saint Charles took place on June 17, 1862, during the American Civil War. The battle was a land and naval engagement, in which Union gunboats engaged Confederate shore batteries and gunboats in a firefight, while infantry troops were landed on the western bank of the White River and eventually drove the Confederate forces from their shore batteries. There are no signs left of the Confederate batteries, and the area is an undeveloped swampland, as it was in 1862.

The site was listed on the National Register of Historic Places in 1974.  The battle is also commemorated by a monument in Saint Charles.

See also
National Register of Historic Places listings in Arkansas County, Arkansas

References

American Civil War on the National Register of Historic Places
American Civil War sites in Arkansas
Battle of St. Charles
Battlefields of the Western Theater of the American Civil War
Conflict sites on the National Register of Historic Places in Arkansas
Geography of Arkansas County, Arkansas
National Register of Historic Places in Arkansas County, Arkansas